From Now On is a 2007 Portuguese film directed by Catarina Ruivo, written by Ruivo and Antonio Figueiredo and produced by Paulo Branco. The film stars Luís Miguel Cintra, Adelaide de Sousa, Antonio Figueiredo, Edgar Morais and Alexandre Pinto.

Plot
Dora (Adelaide de Sousa) divides her time between her work as a beautician, her life with her police officer husband António (Luís Miguel Cintra), and her involvement in left-wing politics.

Cast
 Luís Miguel Cintra as Antonio
 Adelaide de Sousa as Dora
 Edgar Morais as Nelson
 Alexandre Pinto as Jorge
 Antonio Figueiredo as Policeman

Release
From Now On screened for the first time in 2007 at the Rio Film Festival, (Rio de Janeiro, Brazil) and was widely released in Portugal, France and Germany on September 18, 2007. The official premiere took place in Lisbon, Portugal on January 24, 2008.

Awards
2008 Caminhos do Cinema Português 
Won: Best Film

References

External links
 From Now On at the Clap Filmes website
 

2007 films
Films produced by Paulo Branco
Portuguese drama films
2000s Portuguese-language films